Zinc finger CCCH-type with G patch domain-containing protein is a protein that in humans is encoded by the ZGPAT gene.

References

Further reading